Frederick John Griffiths (13 September 1873 – 30 October 1917) was a Welsh association football player of the late 19th and early 20th centuries.  A goalkeeper, he won two caps for the Welsh national team.  He was killed in action during the First World War.

Career
Born in Presteigne, the son of a coal merchant, Griffiths played junior football in Wales before beginning his senior career with the Blackpool-based club South Shore in 1895. He went on to play for other Lancashire-based clubs Clitheroe, Blackpool and Stalybridge Rovers. On 3 February 1900, while on the books of Blackpool, he made his debut for Wales in an international match against Scotland at Aberdeen and later in the year played against England, making him the first Blackpool player to win an international cap. He also played in the Seasiders first ever match at Bloomfield Road.

He later moved south to join Millwall Athletic before moving across London to join Tottenham Hotspur, then playing in the Southern Football League.

In 1901 Griffiths returned to Lancashire to join Preston North End of the English Football League. He made ten league appearances for the club before once more returning to London to play for West Ham United in 1902. He replaced William Biggar in goal after Biggar conceded five goals in a defeat to Wellingborough Town, and remained the club's first-choice goalkeeper for two seasons. In the summer of 1904 he joined New Brompton, where he spent two seasons, making over 50 first team appearances and serving as club captain. He next joined Middlesbrough but never played for the club's first team, before a final move to minor club Moore's Athletic of Shirebrook, where he also worked as a coalminer.

Post-playing career
After retiring from playing, Griffiths worked as a coal miner in the Midlands and trained local teams in Shirebrook before joining the British Army during World War I. He served with the 15th Battalion, Sherwood Foresters (Notts and Derby Regiment), reaching the rank of serjeant. The unit had originally been raised as a bantam battalion in Nottingham in 1915. By 1917 the battalion was part of 35th Division which was thrown into the Battle of Passchendaele in October 1917. Griffiths was killed in action on 30 October 1917, along with four others of his battalion (another 15 were wounded that day). He is buried at the Dozinghem Military Cemetery in West Flanders, Belgium.

References

1873 births
1917 deaths
Welsh military personnel
Welsh footballers
Association football goalkeepers
Wales international footballers
Blackpool F.C. players
Tottenham Hotspur F.C. players
West Ham United F.C. players
Millwall F.C. players
Gillingham F.C. players
Preston North End F.C. players
Middlesbrough F.C. players
Southern Football League players
British military personnel killed in World War I
Sherwood Foresters soldiers
British Army personnel of World War I
People from Presteigne
Sportspeople from Powys